Krunk (Armenian: Կռունկ; 'crane') is an Armenian unmanned aerial vehicle (UAV) in service with the Armed Forces of Armenia.  It is intended for close reconnaissance, transmitting real-time video data (visual or infrared) or taking higher resolution still images.

The Krunk was demonstrated for the first time on September 21, 2011 during a military parade dedicated to the 20th anniversary of the independence of Armenia.

The name refers to range of different models.  Latest ones are Krunk-9 and Krunk-11.

Specifications

Crew: 0 (unmanned)
Capacity: 60 kg (132 lb)
Max speed kmh: 150 km/h (82 knots, 95 mph)
Endurance: 5 hours
Ceiling: 4500 m (13,150 ft)
Max ceiling: 5400 m (15,770 ft)
Length: 3.8 m (12 ft) (5 m (16 ft) with the wings spread out)

Service
 - Armed Forces of Armenia
 - Artsakh Defense Army

See also 
Category: Unmanned aerial vehicles of Armenia

References

Armenian inventions
Unmanned military aircraft of Armenia